This is a list of television news channels from India.

Hindi news channels

A1
Aaj Tak
ABP News
Aryan TV
CNBC Awaaz
DD News
ET Now Swadesh
Good News Today
India News
India TV
Jan TV
Janta TV
Khabar Bharti
Live India
NDTV India
News18 India
News 24
News Nation
News World India
R9 TV
Republic Bharat
Sadhna News
Sahara Samay
Sansad TV
Sudarshan News
Times Now Navbharat
Total TV
TV9 Bharatvarsh
Zee Business
Zee Hindustan
Zee News

Regional Hindi news channels

ABP Ganga
First India News Rajasthan
India News Bihar Jharkhand
India News Haryana
India News Madhya Pradesh Chhattisgarh
India News Rajasthan
India News Uttar Pradesh Uttarakhand
News18 Bihar-Jharkhand
News18 Madhya Pradesh Chhattisgarh
News18 Rajasthan
News18 Uttar Pradesh Uttarakhand
Zee Bihar Jharkhand
Zee Delhi NCR Haryana
Zee Madhya Pradesh Chhattisgarh
Zee Rajasthan
Zee Uttar Pradesh Uttarakhand

English news channels

Bloomberg
CNBC
CNN
ET Now
India Ahead
India Today
Mirror Now
NDTV 24x7
NDTV Profit
News9
NewsX
Republic TV
Times Now
WION

Assamese news channels

Assam Talks
DY 365
News18 Assam-North East
News Live
News Nation Assam
Prag News
Pratidin Time

Bengali news channels

ABP Ananda
Calcutta News
Channel 10
High News
Kolkata TV
News18 Bangla
News Time Bangla
Republic Bangla
TV9 Bangla
Zee 24 Ghanta

Defunct Channels
ETV News Bangla
Focus Bangla
Mahuaa Khobor
Tara Newz

Bhojpuri news channels

India News Bihar Jharkhand
News18 Bihar-Jharkhand
Zee Bihar Jharkhand

Gujarati news channels

ABP Asmita
Gujarat Samachar
News18 Gujarati
Nirmana News
Sandesh News
TV9 Gujarati
VTV-Gujarati
Zee 24 Kalak

Kannada news channels

Janasri News
Kasthuri Newz 24
News18 Kannada
Raj News Kannada
Samaya TV
Suvarna News
TV9 Kannada

Malayalam news channels

Asianet News
Jaihind TV
Janam TV
Kaumudy TV
Mangalam TV
Manorama News
Mathrubhumi News
Media One TV
News 18 Kerala
Reporter TV

Marathi news channels

ABP Majha
Jai Maharashtra
News18 Lokmat
Saam TV
TV9 Marathi
Zee 24 Taas

Odia news channels

Argus News
Bada Khabar
Kalinga TV
Kamyab TV
Kanak News
MBC TV
Nandighosha TV
Naxatra News
News8 Odia
News18 Odia
OTV
Prameya News7

Defunct Channels
ETV News Odia
Focus Odisha
Zee Odisha

Punjabi news channels

ABP Sanjha
BBC News Punjabi
News18 Punjab Haryana Himachal
PTC News
Zee Punjab Haryana Himachal

Tamil news channels

ABP Nadu
Captain News
Jaya Plus
Kalaignar Seithigal
Lotus News
News18 Tamil Nadu
News J
Polimer News
Puthiya Thalaimurai TV
Raj News 24X7
Sun News

Telugu news channels

10TV
99TV
ABN Andhra Jyothi
ETV2
ETV Andhra Pradesh
HMTV
MOJO TV
NTV
Prime9 News
Sakshi TV
Studio N
T News
TV1
TV5
TV9 Telugu
V6 News

Urdu news channels

Aalami Samay
News18 Urdu
Zee Salaam

See also
Television in India
Lists of global television channels

News